Patricia Selma Villegas García (born 1969) is a lawyer and diplomat from the Dominican Republic.

Early life and family
Villegas was born in 1969 into an affluent white Dominican family. Her parents were Víctor Villegas and Amada García Pichardo. Her paternal great-grandfather Faustino de Soto was Senator for El Seibo Province in the 19th century. She is also descended from General Ramón Santana, the twin brother of Lieutenant-General Pedro Santana, 1st President of the Dominican Republic and Marquis of Las Carreras.

She studied in the Colegio Serafín de Asís catholic school in Santo Domingo and in the Mariemont High School in Cincinnati, Ohio. Villegas studied law at the Institut Catholique de Paris and the Pontifical Catholic University Mother and Teacher (PUCMM) and has a Masters in Business Law and Economic Law.

Career 
She was professor of Intellectual Property Law at the PUCMM.

She co-founded the law firm Jorge Mera & Villegas with Orlando Jorge Mera and is a member of the International Federation of Intellectual Property Attorneys.

Villegas is a devout Roman Catholic and belongs to Heralds of the Gospel and cooperates with the Opus Dei.

Since 2021 Villegas is serving as the Dominican Republic Ambassador to Brazil.

Personal life
Villegas married to Orlando Jorge Mera in 1991 and had 2 children: Orlando and Patricia Jorge Villegas.

Her husband was assassinated in 2022.

References

External links 
 

1969 births
Living people
People from Santo Domingo
Institut Catholique de Paris alumni
Pontificia Universidad Católica Madre y Maestra alumni
Academic staff of the Pontificia Universidad Católica Madre y Maestra
Modern Revolutionary Party politicians
Ambassadors of the Dominican Republic to Brazil
Dominican Republic people of Canarian descent
Dominican Republic people of Dutch descent
Dominican Republic people of English descent
Dominican Republic people of French descent
Dominican Republic people of Spanish descent
Dominican Republic women ambassadors
White Dominicans
Dominican Republic Roman Catholics
Heralds of the Gospel
Opus Dei members